David Rueda is professor of comparative politics at Nuffield College, University of Oxford who researches comparative political economy, the welfare state and labour market policy. He is an editor of the Socio-Economic Review.

Education 
Rueda was born in Seville, Spain and grew up in nearby San Fernando, Cádiz. He completed his high school education at the United World College of the American West in New Mexico, earning an International Baccalaureate Diploma in 1989. He received his BA in economics in 1993 from Franklin & Marshall College, Pennsylvania, and subsequently studied at the School of Oriental and African Studies, University of London, where he earned an MSc in politics of Asia and Africa in 1994. He received his MA (1998) and PhD (2001) from Cornell University.

Career
He was an assistant professor in the Department of Political Science at Binghamton University from 2001 till 2004. From 2004 to 2006 he worked as a university lecturer in quantitative political science, Department of Politics and International Relations at Oxford University. He later became a Professor of Comparative Politics in the Department of Politics and International Relations, and worked in this position from 2006 till 2013. In 2013 he became a Professor of Comparative Politics, Department of Politics and International Relations, and professorial fellow, at Oxford's Nuffield College.

Awards

He received a Social Science Korea research award for “Inequality and Democracy” (2014-2017), and British Academy Research Development Award for “The Political Consequences of Inequality” (2008-2010).

Selected publications

Books

Book chapters

Journal articles 
 
 
 
  Pdf.

References 

Fellows of Nuffield College, Oxford
Academics of the University of Oxford
Living people
Year of birth missing (living people)
British political scientists
People educated at a United World College